Rubroboletus latisporus is a bolete fungus in the family Boletaceae. It is found in Yunnan province in southwestern China, associated with Pinus massoniana and Quercus trees.

References

Fungi described in 2014
Fungi of China
latisporus